John Murphy (born 11 March 1935), sometimes known as Basher Murphy, was a Scottish footballer who made over 290 appearances in the Scottish League for Queen of the South and Cowdenbeath as a left half. He also played ice hockey for Dunfermline Royals.

Personal life 
Murphy served his National Service in the RAF and was stationed at RAF Padgate and in the Netherlands. While in the Netherlands, he trained with Sparta Rotterdam, but was unable to secure a work permit to play. After his retirement from football, Murphy worked as a joiner and at Andrew's Antennas in Lochgelly.

Honours 

Cowdenbeath Hall of Fame

References 

1935 births
Living people
Scottish footballers
Cowdenbeath F.C. players
Scottish Football League players
Association football wing halves
Bonnyrigg Rose Athletic F.C. players
Crossgates Primrose F.C. players
Queen of the South F.C. players
Royal Air Force airmen
Raith Rovers F.C. players
People from Hill of Beath
Scottish carpenters